Andorra competed at the 2016 Winter Youth Olympics in Lillehammer, Norway from 12 to 21 February 2016.

Alpine skiing

Boys

Cross-country skiing

Girls

See also
Andorra at the 2016 Summer Olympics

References

2016 in Andorran sport
Nations at the 2016 Winter Youth Olympics
Andorra at the Youth Olympics